Anandur is a panchayat village in Mysore Taluka, Mysore District, Karnataka, India.

Geography
Anandur is located in the far northwest of Mysore District, bordered to the southeast by Koorgalli panchayat village, to the southwest and west by Gungralchatra panchayat village, and to the north and east by the Krishna Raja Sagara with Mandya District across the reservoir.

Governance
Anandur is the gram panchayat with administration over Anandur village and Chikkanahalli, Kallinathapura, Kallurunaganahalli, Kallurunaganahalli Kaval, Subramanyapura, Undavadi, Yadahalli villages as well. In December 2012, Vijayalakshmi Manju was elected as chairperson of the Anandur gram panchayat.

Demographics
 census, Anandur panchayat area had 6,882 inhabitants, with 3,474 males and 3,408 females. The village of Anandur had 1,570 inhabitants, with 806 males and 764 females.

Notes

Villages in Mysore district